Jaklapallisaurus is a genus of unaysaurid sauropodomorph dinosaur. It lived during the Late Triassic period (late Norian to earliest Rhaetian) in what is now Telangana, central India. It is known from the holotype ISI R274, postcranial material which was collected from the Upper Maleri Formation (late Norian–earliest Rhaetian) of the Pranhita–Godavari Basin and from the referred material ISI R279, partially complete right femur which was collected from the Lower Dharmaram Formation (latest Norian–Rhaetian). It was first named by Fernando E. Novas, Martin D. Ezcurra, Sankar Chatterjee and Tharavat S. Kutty in 2011 and the type species is Jaklapallisaurus asymmetrica. The generic name is derived from the Indian town of Jaklapalli which is close to the type locality. The specific name refers to the highly asymmetrical astragalus of this species in distal view. A cladistic analysis by Novas et al. found that all valid plateosaurid species form a large polytomy. Jaklapallisaurus was found along with the basal sauropodomorph Nambalia, a guaibasaurid, and two basal dinosauriforms.

Classification 
Jaklapallisaurus, alongside Macrocollum and Unaysaurus, was found to belong to the clade Unaysauridae.

References 

Sauropodomorphs
Norian life
Rhaetian life
Dinosaurs of India and Madagascar
Late Triassic dinosaurs of Asia
Triassic India
Fossils of India
Fossil taxa described in 2011
Taxa named by Fernando Novas